Sanjwal Cantonment railway station 
() is  located in Sanjwal Cantonment, Attock District, Pakistan.

See also
 List of railway stations in Pakistan
 Pakistan Railways

References

External links

Railway stations in Attock District